The 2019 LFA Primeira is the fourth season of the Liga Futebol Amadora Primeira Divisão. The season scheduled began on April 27 and finished on September 29. 

Boavista is the current defending champions.

Teams
There are 8 teams that played this season.

Champions

from Primeira
DIT F.C. and Cacusan were relegated to 2019 LFA Segunda after finished 7th and bottom place of 2018 LFA Primeira.

to Primeira
Assalam and Lalenok United promoted to 2019 LFA Primeira after securing place as champions and runners-up in 2018 LFA Segunda.

Locations

Personnel and kits

Managerial changes

Stadiums 
 Primary venues used in the 2019 LFA Primera:

Foreign players
Restricting the number of foreign players strictly to five per team. A team could use four foreign players on the field each game. Name on BOLD was foreign players who registered in mid-season transfer window.

League table

Result table

Season statistics

Top scorers

Hat-tricks
 
Notes:
(H) – Home ; (A) – Away
4 – player scorer 4 goals
6 – player scorer 6 goals
7 – player scorer 7 goals

See also
 2019 LFA Segunda
 2019 Taça 12 de Novembro

Notes

References

External links
Official website
Official Facebook page

LFA Primeira seasons
Timor-Leste
LFA Primeira